Cultura Política was a political and cultural magazine based in Rio de Janeiro, Brazil. It was one of the cultural apparatuses developed by the Estado Novo to diffuse the official ideology to the whole Brazilian society. It was in circulation between 1941 and 1945.

History and profile
Cultura Política was established by Almir de Andrade in 1941. The first issue appeared in March 1941. The headquarters of the magazine was in Rio de Janeiro. The publisher was the department of press and propaganda. The magazine produced fifty issues during its lifetime and was edited by Almir de Andrade. Some of the major contributors included Francisco Campos, Azevedo Amaral, Lourival Fontes, Cassiano Ricardo, Graciliano Ramos, Gilberto Freyre and Nelson Werneck Sodre. It ended publication in October 1945.

References

1941 establishments in Brazil
1945 disestablishments in Brazil
Cultural magazines
Defunct magazines published in Brazil
Defunct political magazines
Magazines established in 1941
Magazines disestablished in 1945
Mass media in Rio de Janeiro (city)
Political magazines published in Brazil
Portuguese-language magazines
State media